Kazimierz Przybyś (born 11 July 1960 in Radom) is a Polish former footballer. During his club career, he played for Broń Radom, Śląsk Wrocław and Widzew Łódź. He earned 15 caps for the Poland national football team and participated in the 1986 FIFA World Cup, where Poland reached the second round.

References

External links
 
 

1960 births
Living people
Polish footballers
Poland international footballers
1986 FIFA World Cup players
Śląsk Wrocław players
Widzew Łódź players
Ekstraklasa players
People from Radom
Sportspeople from Masovian Voivodeship
Association football defenders